Lowden is a name that originates in Scotland, where it is a Scottish variant of the geographic name Lothian. Lowden may refer to:

People
Frank Orren Lowden (1861–1943), American politician
George Lowden (born 1951), British guitar maker
Gordon Lowden (1927–2012), British accountant
Hunter Lowden (born 1982), Canadian sailor
Jack Lowden (born 1990), Scottish actor
John Lowden (born 1953), British art historian 
Luke Lowden (born 1991), Australian football player
Sue Lowden (born 1952), American politician
Victor Lowden (1923–1998), British pilot and businessman
William Lowden (c.1740-1820), Scottish-Canadian merchant and shipbuilder

Places
Lowden, Iowa
Lowden, Washington
Lowden State Park, Illinois

See also
Loudon (disambiguation)